Lured  is a 1947 film noir directed by Douglas Sirk and starring George Sanders, Lucille Ball, Charles Coburn, and Boris Karloff. The film is a remake of 1939 French film Pièges directed by Robert Siodmak, which was titled Personal Column in the United States; Personal Column was also the title of this film when it was originally released.  It did not do good business under that name, so United Artists pulled it from circulation, and subsequently re-released it with the current title.

The film's sets were designed by the art director Nicolai Remisoff.

Plot
Sandra Carpenter (Lucille Ball) is an American who had come to London in order to perform in a show, but is now working as a taxi dancer. She is upset to find out that friend and fellow dancer Lucy Barnard (Tanis Chandler) is missing and also believed to be the latest victim of the notorious "Poet Killer," who lures victims with ads in newspapers' personal columns, afterwards sending poems to taunt the police.

Scotland Yard Inspector Harley Temple (Charles Coburn) believes the killer to be influenced by the 19th-century French poet Charles Baudelaire. He asks if Sandra would be willing to work undercover to help find her missing friend and the killer. He sees first-hand how observant she is and gives her a temporary police identification card and a gun. Sandra is asked to answer personal ads, watched over by an officer bodyguard, H.R. Barrett (George Zucco).

By coincidence, she meets the dashing man-about-town stage revue producer Robert Fleming (George Sanders). In the meantime, Sandra answers an ad placed by Charles van Druten (Boris Karloff), a former fashion designer, who is now mentally imbalanced. Barrett has to come to her rescue.

She next needs to be saved, this time by Fleming, from a mysterious figure named Mr. Moryani (Joseph Calleia). Moryani apparently lures young women to South America by offering them a promising opportunity whilst, in reality, wanting to recruit them for forced slavery or other forced services.

Fleming shares a stately home with Julian Wilde (Cedric Hardwicke), his business partner and friend. Fleming ultimately does win Sandra's heart, and they become engaged. Inspector Temple thanks her for her efforts and even agrees to come to their engagement party.

During the party, Sandra accidentally discovers incriminating evidence in Fleming's desk, including a distinctive bracelet worn by her friend Lucy and her photograph. Fleming learns that Sandra was an undercover police agent when he is placed under arrest. Circumstantial evidence mounts up, his typewriter is identified as the one used for the poems, although he adamantly denies any involvement in the crimes. Sandra still loves him and believes him, but Scotland Yard do not. Fleming refuses to see Sandra, believing she only pretended to be in love with him in order to trap him.

Lucy's body is found in the river. Wilde assures his incarcerated friend that he will hire the best lawyer and do everything possible to clear him. It occurs to Inspector Temple that it is Wilde who fancies poetry and more likely to be the killer. Temple confronts Wilde, but has no proof, and then learns that Fleming has confessed to the murders.  As Wilde prepares to flee the country, he is visited by Sandra. He is secretly obsessed with her, just as he was with the other women he abducted. Wilde at first expresses his desire for Sandra, then removes his scarf and tries to strangle her. Scotland Yard's men, led by Barrett, break through the windows to rescue her, just in time. It is then revealed that Fleming's confession was faked, part of a scheme by Sandra and Temple to trap Wilde. Fleming is set free, and he and Sandra make up and toast to better days ahead.

Cast
 George Sanders as Robert Fleming
 Lucille Ball as Sandra Carpenter
 Charles Coburn as Chief Inspector Harley Temple
 Boris Karloff as Charles van Druten
 Sir Cedric Hardwicke as Julian Wilde
 Joseph Calleia as Dr. Nicholas Moryani
 Alan Mowbray as Lyle Maxwell alias Maxim Duval, Moryani's accomplice
 George Zucco as Officer H.R. Barrett
 Robert Coote as detective
 Alan Napier as Inspector Gordon
 Tanis Chandler as Lucy Barnard
 Ethelreda Leopold as blonde nightclub singer (voice dubbed by Annette Warren)

Reception

Film critic Dennis Schwartz gave the film a mixed review, writing "The flawed film never settles into a dark and sinister mood (filmed in a Hollywood studio) but succeeds only in keeping things tension-free and lighthearted with continuous breezy comical conversations as Ball does a sturdy Nancy Drew turn at sleuthing with her comical detective partner Zucco (who knew the usually typecast villain could be so amusing!). It can't quite measure up to compelling film noir, but it's pleasing and easy to handle despite everything feeling so contrived and confining."

References

External links
 
 
 
 
 

1947 films
1940s psychological thriller films
American crime thriller films
American remakes of French films
American black-and-white films
American detective films
Film noir
Films directed by Douglas Sirk
Films scored by Michel Michelet
Films set in London
American police detective films
American serial killer films
United Artists films
American neo-noir films
1940s English-language films
1940s American films